The 2012–13 Coastal Carolina Chanticleers men's basketball team represented Coastal Carolina University during the 2012–13 NCAA Division I men's basketball season. The Chanticleers, led by sixth year head coach Cliff Ellis, played their home games at the brand new HTC Center and were members of the South Division of the Big South Conference. They finished the season 14–15, 9–7 in Big South play to finish in fourth place in the South Division. They lost in the first round of the Big South tournament to Liberty.

Roster

Schedule

|-
!colspan=9| Regular season

|-
!colspan=9| 2013 Big South Conference men's basketball tournament

References

Coastal Carolina Chanticleers men's basketball seasons
Coastal Carolina